Poa leioclada is a species of grass that is endemic to Ecuador.

References

leioclada
Endemic flora of Ecuador
Least concern plants
Taxonomy articles created by Polbot
Taxa named by Eduard Hackel